Thelymitra exigua, commonly called the short sun orchid, is a species of orchid that is endemic to south-eastern Australia. It has a single fleshy, channelled, dark green leaf and up to eight relatively small pale blue flowers with white toothbrush-like tufts on top of the anther.

Description
The lobe on the top of the anther is gently curved and dark brown to black with a yellow tip. The side lobes curve upwards near their middle and have toothbrush-like tufts of white hairs covering their tops. The flowers are self-pollinating, only open on warm to hot sunny days and then only slowly if at all. Flowering occurs from September to November.

Taxonomy and naming
Thelymitra exigua was first formally described in 2004 by Jeff Jeanes from a specimen collected near Woorndoo and the description was published in Muelleria. The specific epithet (exigua) is a Latin word meaning "small", "short", "poor" or "scanty", referring to the relatively short, stout nature of this orchid.

Distribution and habitat
The short sun orchid grows in grassland, heath and shrubland. It is found in western Victoria, south-eastern South Australia and in Tasmania, including on King Island.

References

External links
 

exigua
Endemic orchids of Australia
Orchids of South Australia
Orchids of Victoria (Australia)
Orchids of Tasmania
Plants described in 2004